The Einar and Alice Borton House is located in Eau Claire, Wisconsin.

History
Einar Borton was a bank teller. This house, belonging to him and his wife, is a Lustron house. It was added to the State Register of Historic Places in 2012 and to the National Register of Historic Places the following year.

References

Houses on the National Register of Historic Places in Wisconsin
National Register of Historic Places in Eau Claire County, Wisconsin
Lustron houses
Houses in Eau Claire, Wisconsin
Houses completed in 1949